Nerdette is a weekly talk podcast produced and distributed by WBEZ/Chicago Public Media.

It was created in 2013 by Tricia Bobeda and Greta Johnsen, and is now hosted by Johnsen. It is an interview show featuring conversations with journalists, advice columnists, authors, astronauts, and more. Previous guests include Tom Hanks, Bill Nye, George R.R. Martin, Margaret Atwood, Roxane Gay, and Lizzo.

An offshoot podcast, Nerdette Recaps with Peter Sagal, includes Bobeda, Johnsen, and Wait Wait ... Don't Tell Me! host Sagal discussing shows like Game of Thrones (2016-2020) and His Dark Materials (2019), and a handful of movies from the 1990s (2020).

History 
Johnsen was a host and reporter at WBEZ when she launched it in late May 2013 with Bobeda, a producer at WBEZ at the time.

The duo described it as "a safe space for nerding out about all the things you're watching, reading, listening to and encountering IRL (in real life)." Bobeda's first interaction with Johnsen was when Johnsen overheard Bobeda in a debate in the WBEZ newsroom about Star Wars.

In April 2016, a spin-off of Nerdette was launched in partnership with Peter Sagal, host of NPR’s Wait Wait...Don’t Tell Me! to recap season 5 of the HBO series Game of Thrones. Nerdette Recaps Game of Thrones with Peter Sagal continued with each Game of Thrones season until the final season aired in 2019. Nerdette Recaps continued beyond Game of Thrones with seasons including recaps of HBO's His Dark Materials in 2019 and reviews of 1990s movies in 2020.

In 2018, Bobeda left the show and Johnsen became the sole host.

In addition to its weekly talk episodes, Nerdette also started a monthly book club in 2020.

Production 
Greta Johnsen hosts and produces the podcast, along with producer Isabel Carter and executive producer Brendan Banaszak.

Format 
The format typically includes discussion between Greta Johnsen and a panel of guests to discuss relevant cultural topics. Topics have included re-entry to society after the COVID-19 pandemic, along with other pop culture news of the week.

Twice a month, Nerdette has two book club episodes—one is a conversation with the author, and the other is a panel discussion that includes voice recordings from the audience.

Episodes are usually 20–40 minutes long and released one to two times a week: The regular episodes are every Friday, and book club episodes come out on Tuesdays.

Reception 
Nerdette was named Best Culture Podcast by the Chicago Reader in 2017.

References 

2013 podcast debuts
American podcasts
Audio podcasts
Interview podcasts